There are several figures named Pelagon (Ancient Greek: Πελάγων, -ονος) in Greek mythology.

 Pelagon, king of Phocis and son of Amphidamas. He gave Cadmus the cow that was to guide him to Boeotia.
 Pelagon, also called Pelasgus, son of the river-god Asopus by the naiad Metope, daughter of the river Ladon. He was brother to Ismenus, Corcyra, Salamis, Aegina, Peirene, Cleone, Thebe, Tanagra, Thespia, Asopis, Sinope, Ornea, Chalcis, Harpina and Ismene. His sisters were abducted by various gods as punishment for their father's deed.
 Pelagon, one of the suitors of Hippodamia before Pelops.
 Pelagon, one of the Calydonian hunters.
 Pelagon or Pelegon, who is given in the Iliad as the father of the Paeonian warrior Asteropaeus, son of the river-god Axius and Periboea, the daughter of Acessamenus. Presumably this Pelagon was the eponymous founder of Pelagonia.
 Pelagon, a native of Pylos who fought under Nestor in the Trojan War.
 Pelagon, an "illustrious" companion of the hero Sarpedon during the Trojan War, who removes Tlepolemus' spear from Sarpedon's thigh.

Notes

References 

 Apollodorus, The Library with an English Translation by Sir James George Frazer, F.B.A., F.R.S. in 2 Volumes, Cambridge, MA, Harvard University Press; London, William Heinemann Ltd. 1921. Online version at the Perseus Digital Library. Greek text available from the same website.
 Diodorus Siculus, The Library of History translated by Charles Henry Oldfather. Twelve volumes. Loeb Classical Library. Cambridge, Massachusetts: Harvard University Press; London: William Heinemann, Ltd. 1989. Vol. 3. Books 4.59–8. Online version at Bill Thayer's Web Site
 Diodorus Siculus, Bibliotheca Historica. Vol 1-2. Immanel Bekker. Ludwig Dindorf. Friedrich Vogel. in aedibus B. G. Teubneri. Leipzig. 1888-1890. Greek text available at the Perseus Digital Library.
 Pausanias, Description of Greece with an English Translation by W.H.S. Jones, Litt.D., and H.A. Ormerod, M.A., in 4 Volumes. Cambridge, MA, Harvard University Press; London, William Heinemann Ltd. 1918. Online version at the Perseus Digital Library
 Pausanias, Graeciae Descriptio. 3 vols. Leipzig, Teubner. 1903.  Greek text available at the Perseus Digital Library.
 Publius Ovidius Naso, Metamorphoses translated by Brookes More (1859-1942). Boston, Cornhill Publishing Co. 1922. Online version at the Perseus Digital Library.
 Publius Ovidius Naso, Metamorphoses. Hugo Magnus. Gotha (Germany). Friedr. Andr. Perthes. 1892. Latin text available at the Perseus Digital Library.

Kings of Phocis
Children of Asopus
Boeotian mythology
Paeonian mythology
Characters in the Iliad
Phocian characters in Greek mythology